Notobalanus is a genus of acorn barnacles in the family Balanidae. There are at least two described species in Notobalanus.

Species
These species belong to the genus Notobalanus:
 Notobalanus flosculus (Darwin, 1854)
 Notobalanus vestitus (Darwin, 1854)

References

External links

 

Barnacles